Eduard Gusev (14 March 1936 – 14 September 2016) was a Russian cyclist who raced for the Soviet Union.  He competed in the team pursuit event at the 1956 Summer Olympics.

References

External links
 

1936 births
2016 deaths
Russian male cyclists
Soviet male cyclists
Olympic cyclists of the Soviet Union
Cyclists at the 1956 Summer Olympics
Place of birth missing